The Volusia County Marine Science Center is a marine science and natural history museum in Ponce Inlet, Volusia County, Florida.

Exhibition 
The museum's exhibits includes a humpback whale skull, freshwater turtles, turtle rehabilitation area, a 5,000 gallon hexagonal artificial reef aquarium and stingray touch pool with cownose rays.

Rehabilitation center 

The Center also works to rehabilitate injured seabirds and sea turtles.
Visitors can view many of these animals from an outdoor boardwalk. There is also a bird observation tower.

References

External links

Marine Science Center website

Museums in Volusia County, Florida
Natural history museums in Florida
Aquaria in Florida
Nature centers in Florida
Wildlife rehabilitation and conservation centers